The 2023 Washington State Cougars football team will represent Washington State University in the Pac–12 Conference during the 2023 NCAA Division I FBS football season. The Cougars are expected to be led by Jake Dickert in his third year as head coach. They play their home games at Martin Stadium in Pullman, Washington.

Schedule

References

Washington State
Washington State Cougars football seasons
2023 in sports in Washington (state)